Ragab Abdelhay Saad Abdelrazek Abdalla (born 4 March 1991), known as Ragab Abdalla or Ragab Abdelhay, is an Egyptian weightlifter. He finished fifth at the 2012 Olympics (−85 kg) and fifth at the 2016 Olympics (−94 kg). He won the gold medal at the 2013 Mediterranean Games in the 94 kg event.

Major competitions

References

External links 

 

1991 births
Living people
People from Damietta
Egyptian male weightlifters
Weightlifters at the 2012 Summer Olympics
Weightlifters at the 2016 Summer Olympics
Olympic weightlifters of Egypt
African Games gold medalists for Egypt
African Games medalists in weightlifting
Mediterranean Games gold medalists for Egypt
Mediterranean Games silver medalists for Egypt
Mediterranean Games medalists in weightlifting
Competitors at the 2015 African Games
Competitors at the 2013 Mediterranean Games
Competitors at the 2019 African Games
African Weightlifting Championships medalists
20th-century Egyptian people
21st-century Egyptian people